Choerophryne laurini is a species of frogs in the family Microhylidae. It is endemic to Western New Guinea and known from the Wondiwoi Mountains, at the base of the Wandammen Peninsula. Common name Wandammen albericus frog has been suggested for it (it was formerly placed in the now-synonymized genus Albericus).

Etymology
The specific name laurini refers to Laurin, a king of dwarves in the Nibelungenlied.

Description
Adult males in the type series measure  and the single female  in snout–urostyle length. The snout is short and tapered. The fingers and toes bear relatively large discs. Skin has some warts. The dorsum is brownish with bright, yellowish spots and patches. There is a conspicuous yellow wart behind the mouth. The flanks are yellowish. The ventrum is blackish with many small whitish dots.

The male advertisement call is a pulsed note, uttered in long series. The dominant frequency is at 4–6 kHz.

Habitat and ecology

This species can attain locally high densities, but its known range is very restricted. No threats to it have been identified. The species' range overlaps with the edge of Wandamen Nature Reserve.

References

laurini
Amphibians of Western New Guinea
Endemic fauna of Indonesia
Amphibians described in 2000
Taxonomy articles created by Polbot